Mental illness can be a consequence of miscarriage or early pregnancy loss. Even though women can develop long-term psychiatric symptoms after a miscarriage, acknowledging the potential of mental illness is not usually considered. A mental illness can develop in women who have experienced one or more miscarriages after the event or even years later. Some data suggest that men and women can be affected up to 15 years after the loss. Though recognized as a public health problem, studies investigating the mental health status of women following miscarriage are still lacking. Posttraumatic stress disorder (PTSD) can develop in women who have experienced a miscarriage.  Risks for developing PTSD after miscarriage include emotional pain, expressions of emotion, and low levels of social support. Even if relatively low levels of stress occur after the miscarriage, symptoms of PTSD including flashbacks, intrusive thoughts, dissociation and hyperarousal can later develop.  Clinical depression also is associated with miscarriage. Past responses by clinicians have been to prescribe sedatives.

Recurring miscarriage may increase the incidence of intrusive thoughts in women and their partners.

Miscarriage has an emotional effect and can also lead to psychological disorders. One disorder that can develop is primary maternal preoccupation. This psychological trauma can develop as a response to early pregnancy loss. Anxiety can also develop as a result of a miscarriage. Women describe the medical treatment that they receive contributed their distress.

Intrusive thoughts can develop after the loss. Panic disorder and obsessive thoughts may also develop as a response to a miscarriage. Men may experience pain and psychological effects but react by adopting "compensatory behaviours" such as increasing consumption of alcohol. Because men can consider their role to be supportive, they may not have their loss recognized.

Posttraumatic stress disorder
Women who have had clinical depression before the miscarriage are more likely to develop PTSD.  Posttraumatic stress disorder is associated with miscarriage along with other traumatic events associated with pregnancy. Those who experience recurrent miscarriage (>3) have a greater risk of developing PTSD than those who have experienced miscarriage once. An association between the gender of the infant lost through miscarriage exists whereby there is an increased chance of developing PTSD if the infant was a male. Knowing the cause of the miscarriage does not reduce the risk of developing PTSD. Finding a 'meaning' for the loss reduces the risk of developing PTSD. A negative outlook regarding the world in general is correlated with increased levels of PTSD. Poor self-esteem is also related to developing PTSD after the loss. If memories of the loss are considered intense, risk for PTSD is increased. There are concerns that PTSD in mothers may have a negative impact on children born after the event.

Though the development of PTSD in women and families after the loss has been identified, the presence of PTSD in a woman who is pregnant is detrimental. Women with PTSD are thought to be at a higher risk of prenatal loss, perinatal loss, pregnancy complications, ectopic pregnancy, preterm birth and growth abnormalities in the fetus.

PTSD in a mother is suspected to increase the risk of autism, hypertension, cardiovascular diseases, and type 2 diabetes in a child.

Depression and anxiety
43% of women who miscarry are found to have depression, anxiety disorders, and obsessive-compulsive disorder. 

Complicated grief is an atypical response to a miscarriage. It differs from the more common form of grief that occurs after a miscarriage. The grieving process associated with other events such as the loss of a spouse or parent is expected to decline in a predictable and steady rate. This not true for those experiencing grief after a miscarriage because only 41% follow the expected decline in grief while most (59%) do not fit this pattern.

Cognitive behavior therapy has been found to be helpful if it is begun immediately after the loss.

Epidemiology 
A woman who miscarries has a 2.5 times greater risk for depression than those who have not.  In the US, estimates of PTSD related to miscarriage are thought to be 150,000–200,000 acute and 24,000–32,000 chronic PTSD cases. PTSD in fathers may be significant but remains unaddressed.

References

Bibliography
 

Miscarriage
Maternal disorders predominantly related to pregnancy
Symptoms and signs of mental disorders